Philip Hugh Rodgers (1891 – 1 August 1966) was an English professional golfer who played in the early 20th century. Rodgers' best performance came in the 1927 Open Championship when he tied for tenth place.

Early life
Rodgers was born in Sandycroft,  Hawarden, Flintshire, Wales in 1891, the son of Walter Ernest Rodgers.

Golf career

1927 Open Championship
The 1927 Open Championship was the 62nd Open Championship, held 13–15 July at the Old Course at St Andrews in St Andrews, Scotland. Amateur Bobby Jones successfully defended the title with a dominating six stroke victory, the second of his three victories at the Open Championship. Rodgers had rounds of 76-73-74-77=300 and tied for tenth place with three other players. He won £8 in prize money.

1929 News of the World Matchplay
Rodgers was runner-up to Abe Mitchell in the 1929 News of the World Matchplay at Wentworth, losing 8 & 7 in the final. In 1932 he won the Northern Professional Championship, scoring 298 and winning by a stroke from D. C. Jones.

Death
Rodgers died in Blackpool, Lancashire, on 1 August 1966 aged 74.

Tournament wins
 1932 Northern Professional Championship

Results in major championships

Note: Rodgers only played in The Open Championship.

CUT = missed the half-way cut
"T" indicates a tie for a place

References

English male golfers
People from Hawarden
Sportspeople from Flintshire
1891 births
1966 deaths